Shropshire Council elections are held every four years. Shropshire Council is the local authority for the unitary authority area of Shropshire, within the larger ceremonial county of Shropshire, England. The unitary authority was created on 1 April 2009  as part of the 2009 structural changes to local government in England, taking over the functions of the abolished Shropshire County Council and the five non-metropolitan districts of Bridgnorth, North Shropshire, Oswestry, Shrewsbury and Atcham, and South Shropshire. The Telford and Wrekin district had already become a separate unitary authority in 1998. Since the last full review of boundaries in 2009, 74 councillors have been elected from 63 electoral divisions.

Political control
Shropshire County Council (formally called Salop County Council until 1980) was first created in 1889. Its powers and responsibilities were significantly reformed under the Local Government Act 1972, with a new council elected in 1973 to act as a shadow authority ahead of the new powers coming into force in 1974. It became a unitary authority in 2009, taking over the functions previously exercised by the county's district councils, which were abolished. The new council created in 2009 chose to style itself "Shropshire Council" rather than "Shropshire County Council". Since 1974, political control of the council has been held by the following parties:

Non-metropolitan county

Unitary authority

Leadership
The leaders of the council since 2009 have been:

Council elections
1973 Salop County Council election
1977 Salop County Council election
1981 Shropshire County Council election
1985 Shropshire County Council election
1989 Shropshire County Council election
1993 Shropshire County Council election
1997 Shropshire County Council election
2001 Shropshire County Council election
2005 Shropshire County Council election (boundary changes increased the number of seats by 4)
2009 Shropshire Council election (new division boundaries and became a unitary authority)
2013 Shropshire Council election (minor boundary changes not affecting number of divisions)
2017 Shropshire Council election
2021 Shropshire Council election

County result maps

By-election results
By-elections for individual seats can occur during a council's four-year term, for instance when a councillor dies or resigns their seat.

1997–2001

2001–2005

2005–2009

2009–2013
Five by-elections were held during this term, which saw the Liberal Democrats gain three seats from the Conservatives.

2013–2017

See also
Telford and Wrekin local elections

Former councils in Shropshire:
Bridgnorth local elections
North Shropshire local elections
Oswestry local elections
Shrewsbury and Atcham local elections
South Shropshire local elections

References

 By-election results

External links
Shropshire Council

 
Council elections in Shropshire
Unitary authority elections in England